The Women's Long jump event at the 2014 Asian Games was held at the Incheon Stadium, Incheon, South Korea on 29 September.

Schedule
All times are Korea Standard Time (UTC+09:00)

Records

Results
Legend
DNS — Did not start
NM — No mark

References

Results

Long jump women
2014 women